Josef Bierbichler (born 26 April 1948) is a German actor.

Filmography 
 1976: Heart of Glass – director: Werner Herzog
 1976: Die Atlantikschwimmer
 1977: Bierkampf – director: Herbert Achternbusch
 1977: Servus Bayern
 1977: Tatort – Schüsse in der Schonzeit
 1979: Woyzeck – director: Werner Herzog
 1981: Mein Freund der Scheich (TV film)
 1981: Der Neger Erwin
 1982: The Ghost – director: Herbert Achternbusch
 1983: Straight Through the Heart (TV film)
 1986: Heilt Hitler
 1987: Triumph der Gerechten
 1988: Wohin?
 1991: 
 1993: Deadly Maria – director: Tom Tykwer
 1995: Dicke Freunde (TV film)
 1997: Picasso in München
 1997: Freier Fall (TV film)
 1997: Winter Sleepers – director: Tom Tykwer
 1998: Neue Freiheit – keine Jobs. Schönes München: Stillstand
 2000: Code Unknown – director: Michael Haneke
 2000: The Farewell – director: Jan Schütte
 2001: Heidi
 2001: Ein Dorf sucht seinen Mörder (TV film)
 2003: Polterabend – director: Julian Pölsler (TV film)
 2003: Das Konto (TV film)
 2004: Hierankl – director: Hans Steinbichler
 2004: Außer Kontrolle (TV film)
 2006: Winter Journey – director: Hans Steinbichler
 2007: Bierbichler (Documentary by Regina Schilling)
 2008: A Year Ago in Winter – director: Caroline Link
 2008:  − director: Ina Weisse
 2009: The Bone Man – director: Wolfgang Murnberger
 2009: Germany 09 (Anthology film)
 2009: The White Ribbon – director: Michael Haneke
 2011: Brand
 2013: Exit Marrakech
 2013: Verbrechen (TV series, 6 episodes)
 2014: Landauer – Der Präsident – director: Hans Steinbichler (TV film)
 2015: Don't Look at Me That Way
 2020:  (TV film)

Awards
 Adolf Grimme Award (1998), best performance in the ZDF TV film Freier Fall
 Adolf Grimme Award (2006), best performance in Hierankl, along with Johanna Wokalek, Barbara Sukowa and Peter Simonischek
 Theaterpreis Berlin (2008)
 Fontane Prize of the City of Neuruppin for the novel Mittelreich (2016)

References

External links

1948 births
Living people
German male film actors
German male stage actors
German Film Award winners
20th-century German male actors
21st-century German male actors